Sunnycott Halt (Manx: Stadd Sunnycott) is a wayside request stop on the Manx Electric Railway on the Isle of Man.

Location

The halt is situated on a small "B" road, gaining its name from that of a nearby private dwelling.  As part of the nature of the line, it has in the past been a stopping place for local travellers because the inter-urban line runs with no platformed-stations they can stop anywhere within reason.  This area, over a period of time became established as a regular stopping place.

Also
Manx Electric Railway Stations

References

Sources
 Manx Manx Electric Railway Stopping Places (2002) Manx Electric Railway Society
 Island Island Images: Manx Electric Railway Pages (2003) Jon Wornham
 Official Official Tourist Department Page (2009) Isle Of Man Heritage Railways

Railway stations in the Isle of Man
Manx Electric Railway
Railway stations opened in 1894